Iran is an opponent of Islamic State of Iraq and the Levant (ISIL), fighting the group in Syria and Iraq.

Iran's military action against ISIL

In Syria 

Since the start of the Syrian Civil War in 2011, Iran is supporting the Syrian government against its opponents, including ISIL.

In Iraq 

Iran was the first country  to pledge assistance to Iraq to fight ISIL, deploying troops in early June 2014 following the North Iraq offensive.

President of Iraq Fuad Masum has praised Iran as "the first country to provide weapons to Iraq to fight against the ISIL Takfiri terrorists".

Iran's Quds Force is a "key player" in the military intervention against ISIL and its "mastermind" commander Major General Qassem Soleimani maintained a frequent presence in Iraq while his pictures in the battlefield were regularly published.

Iran–Iraq border

In 14 March 2016, two ISIL cells equipped with explosive devices were eliminated near the border by the Ground Forces of Islamic Republic of Iran Army.

Iran's political stance 
Foreign Affairs Minister of Iran Javad Zarif has described ISIL as an "ideological sibling" to Al-Qaeda, adding "the so-called Islamic State, is neither Islamic nor a state".

Supreme Leader of Iran Ali Khamenei has openly commented on the American-led intervention in Iraq and the Combined Joint Task Force:

Designation as "terrorist" 
Iranian official and semi-official media outlets such as state-run Iran Daily, and IRGC-tied news agencies Fars and Tasnim frequently call ISIL as "terrorist organization" and "Takfiri".

The deputy secretary of Supreme National Security Council has also called it "terrorist group".

ISIL's threats to Iran 

While Iran is a Shia-dominant country, ISIL is ideologically anti-Shia and regards Shias as infidels, having killed thousands of them. After rapidly expanding in Iraq, ISIL became a threat only kilometers away from Iranian western borders. With the Pakistan-based Sunni Jihadist groups in eastern Iran and an ongoing Sistan and Baluchestan insurgency, some alarmed the possibility of a wider backlash there.

Iran threatened ISIL that managing to attack Baghdad or holy shrines of Shia Imams and getting close to Iran-Iraq border is "over the red lines" and if they are crossed, Iran will engage in a direct action.

In September 2014, Iranian paper Islamic Republican quoted Hadana news reporting "ISIL designated Emir for Iran and several of his aides were arrested by security bodies". The report did not name the Emir, and did not say if they had been able to sneak into Iran or arrested abroad. Neither did it mention the security bodies of which country have made the arrest.

In the same month, Minister of Interior Abdolreza Rahmani Fazli announced Iran has arrested several suspected members of ISIL trying to enter Iran. He said that two or three of them have confessed "entering Iran has been among the plans of the ISIL" and dismissed the reports on the ISIL move to recruit members inside Iran, despite noting "this does not mean that the group has not launched a publicity campaign for recruitment".

On 29 January 2015, ISIL announced a new province called Wilayat Khorasan consisting of Afghanistan, Pakistan, and "other nearby lands". Hafiz Saeed Khan was designated as Emir of the province.
Pakistani Hafiz Saeed Khan, also known as Mulla Saeed Orakzai, is a former member of the Taliban.

On 7 June 2017, ISIL claimed responsibility for an attack on the Iranian Parliament and the mausoleum of Ayatollah Khomeini. The attack was confirmed to have left 16 dead and was the first instance of an ISIL attack within Iran's borders. There are worries about the implications of this attack on President Hassan Rouhani's "moderation project".

Iranian citizens and ISIL 
Tehran Bureau reports a popular support on Iran's military action against ISIL.

According to Al Jazeera, as of January 2015 "hundreds" of Iranian Sunni Kurds have crossed the Iran-Iraq border to fight ISIL, mostly joining Iraqi Kurdistan fighters also known as Peshmerga.

Several research works and polls conducted by a security body in Iran have shown that Iran's Sunni community "are not interested in membership in the ISIL". However, Erbil-based website Rudaw cites a Facebook post from the One ISIL page saying that in October 2014, 23 Kurds from Iran had joined the group. Kurdish activist Mokhtar Hoshmand has claimed "20 Iranian Kurdish members of ISIL have been killed and 30 have been injured".

References

Islamic State of Iraq and the Levant and Iran
Iranian involvement in the Syrian civil war
Islamism_in_Iran